Amina Anshba and Elizabeth Mandlik were the defending champions but chose not to participate.

Eudice Chong and Cody Wong Hong-yi won the title, defeating Tímea Babos and Valeria Savinykh in the final, 7–5, 5–7, [13–11].

Seeds

Draw

Draw

References
Main Draw

Tuks International - Doubles